Alquina was an unincorporated community in Jennings Township, Fayette County, Indiana.

History
Alquina was founded in 1813 by Joseph Vanmeter. One source speculates it was named after Alquines, in France.

A post office was established at Alquina in 1832, and remained in operation until it was discontinued in 1903.

Geography
Alquina was the home of the Alquina Blue Arrows High School. The high school was closed in 1966 and the elementary school continued until 2010.

References

Unincorporated communities in Fayette County, Indiana
Unincorporated communities in Indiana